The 2009–10 Minnesota Golden Gophers men's basketball team represented the University of Minnesota in the college basketball season of 2009–2010. The team's head coach was Tubby Smith in his third year. The Golden Gophers played their home games at Williams Arena in Minneapolis and are members of the Big Ten Conference. They finished the season 21–14, 9–9 in Big Ten play. They advanced to the championship game of the 2010 Big Ten Conference men's basketball tournament before losing to Ohio State. They received an at-large bid to the 2010 NCAA Division I men's basketball tournament, earning an 11 seed in the West Region. They lost to six-seed and AP #25 Xavier in the first round.

Season
Royce White signed with the Minnesota Golden Gophers, but did not play due to shoplifting and trespassing charges. He transferred to Iowa State in July 2010.

Roster

2009–10 Schedule and results

|-
!colspan="8" style="text-align: center; background:#800000" | Exhibition

|-
! colspan="8" style="text-align: center; background:#800000"|Regular season

|-
! colspan="9" style="text-align: center; background:#800000"|Big Ten Regular Season

|-
! colspan="9" style="text-align: center; background:#800000"|2010 Big Ten tournament 

|-
! colspan="9" style="text-align: center; background:#800000"|2010 NCAA Men's Basketball tournament

Rankings

*AP does not release post-NCAA Tournament rankings^Coaches did not release a Week 1 poll.

References

Minnesota Golden Gophers men's basketball seasons
Minnesota
Minnesota
2010 in sports in Minnesota
2009 in sports in Minnesota